Aron Kuppermann (May 6, 1926 – October 14, 2011) was a professor of chemical physics at California Institute of Technology. The author of more than 200 publications, he is perhaps best known for his work in the application of quantum mechanics to the solution of problems in chemical reaction dynamics and kinetics. Kuppermann and George Schatz completed the first calculation of the dynamics of a chemical reaction in a full 3-dimensional quantum model.

Kuppermann earned degrees in Chemical Engineering (1948) and Civil Engineering (1952) from the University of São Paulo. He served as an Assistant Professor of Chemistry at the Instituto Tecnológico de Aeronáutica in São José dos Campos (1950–51). He was a British Council Scholar at the University of Edinburgh, Scotland in 1953, and earned a Ph.D. in Physical Chemistry at the University of Notre Dame in 1955. He then joined the faculty of the University of Illinois (1955-1963) and subsequently came to California Institute of Technology in 1963.

Awards and Recognitions

Kuppermann received the Centennial of Science Award from Notre Dame in 1965. In 1967 he was the Venable Lecturer at the University of North Carolina, and in 1968 was named the Werner Lecturer at the University of Kansas. He was the Kolthoff Lecturer at the University of Minnesota in 1984. He was a John Simon Guggenheim Fellow at the Weizmann Institute and the University of São Paulo in 1976 and 1977.

References

1926 births
California Institute of Technology faculty
2011 deaths
University of São Paulo alumni
Brazilian expatriates in the United Kingdom
University of Notre Dame alumni
University of Illinois Urbana-Champaign faculty
Brazilian expatriates in the United States